Gloucester Road may refer to:
 Gloucester Road, London
 Gloucester Road tube station
 Gloucester Road, Hong Kong
 Gloucester Road, Bristol, the A38 through Horfield
 Gloucester Road, Singapore